The Canon de 194 mm Modèle 1893-1896 was a turret mounted medium-caliber naval gun used as the primary armament of a number of armored cruisers of the French Navy during World War I.

Design
The mle 1893/1896 guns were typical built-up guns of the period with several layers of steel reinforcing hoops.  The guns used an interrupted screw breech and fired separate loading bagged charges and projectiles.

Naval service
Ships that carried the Mle 1893-1896 include:
  - The primary armament of this class of five armored cruisers consisted of two, 194/40 guns, in single turrets, fore and aft.
  - The primary armament of this class of three armored cruisers consisted of two, 194/40 guns, in single turrets, fore and aft.
  - The primary armament of this class of three armored cruisers consisted of four, 194/40 guns, in twin turrets, fore and aft.
  - The primary armament of this armored cruiser consisted of two, 194/40 guns, in single turrets, fore and aft.
  - The primary armament of this armored cruiser consisted of two, 194/40 guns, in single turrets, fore and aft.

Ammunition

The Mle 1893-1896 used separate-loading ammunition with a bagged charge weighing .

Notes

References

External links 

 France 194 mm/40 (7.64") Model 1893, 194 mm/40 (7.64") Model 1893-1896

Naval guns of France
194 mm artillery
World War I naval weapons